Jade Jolie is the stage name of Joshua Green, (born November 2, 1986) an American drag queen and Taylor Swift impersonator known for competing in the fifth season of RuPaul's Drag Race and the fourth season of The Boulet Brothers' Dragula.

She featured in Swift’s "You Need to Calm Down" music video and joined her at the 2019 MTV Video Music Awards in the opening act, as well as receiving two awards with Swift, including Video of the Year.

Early life 
Green was born on November 2, 1986. He started doing drag at the University Club in Gainesville, Florida. His drag mom is Dana Douglas. The name Jade Jolie is a combination of the Mortal Kombat character Jade and Angelina Jolie. He originally auditioned for season five of Drag Race, where he reached the top eight.

Career 
Before Drag Race, Green worked as an adult performer under the name Tristan Everhard. He was in Volume 213 of the porn website "Showguys" in 2007.

Jolie was announced as one of fourteen contestants for the fifth season of RuPaul's Drag Race in 2013. She was placed in the bottom three in the first episode, but was spared over Serena ChaCha and Penny Tration. She played as Taylor Swift for the annual Snatch Game. She was later eliminated in the sixth episode after losing a lip sync to The Pointer Sisters "I'm So Excited" against Coco Montrese. A fight between Jolie and Alyssa Edwards in an episode of "Untucked" included Jolie commenting on Edwards's "Back rolls", which became an internet meme. She appeared as a guest in the shows season eight grand finale.

After Drag Race, Jolie was in the music video for Pandora Boxx's "Knew You Seemed Shady!" on July 23, 2013. In 2017, Jolie was part of Phi Phi O'Hara's drag benefit show to raise funds for the victims of Hurricane Maria in Puerto Rico, with other Drag Race alumni. She was also in the music video for Alaska's "Snaked" on December 24, 2018, playing Taylor Swift. She portrayed Swift again in the music video for Swift's "You Need to Calm Down" on June 17, 2019.

On August 26, 2019, Jolie performed alongside Taylor Swift during her 2019 MTV Video Music Awards performance. After Swift won the Video of the Year Award, presenter John Travolta confused Jolie for Swift herself and attempted to hand her the award.

In September 2021, Jolie was announced as part of the cast of the fourth season of The Boulet Brothers' Dragula, becoming the first Drag Race alum to compete on the show, and placed sixth.

In October 2021, Jolie performed at Dragathon: Halloween Night Spooktacular.

Personal life 
In 2013, Jolie was involved in a Twitter fight with Mimi Imfurst, presumably from the way Imfurst introduced Jolie at Logo's NYC Pride event, which Jolie took offense to. The fight included Imfurst stating Jolie was in prostitution, and Jolie calling Imfurst a "loser." Judge Michelle Visage stepped in to break up the fight. In September 2021, Jolie issued a public apology for portraying a Nazi soldier in a pornographic film years prior.

Filmography

Film

Television

Music videos

Web series

References

External links 

Instagram
 

1986 births
Living people
LGBT people from Florida
RuPaul's Drag Race contestants
The Boulet Brothers' Dragula contestants